Out-of-band activity is activity outside a defined telecommunications frequency band, or, metaphorically, outside of any primary communication channel. Protection from falsing is among its purposes.

Examples

General usage
 Out-of-band agreement, an agreement or understanding between the communicating parties that is not included in any message sent over the channel but which is relevant for the interpretation of such messages
 More broadly, communication by any channel other than the primary channel can be considered "out-of-band".  For example, given a website's primary communication method is the internet, out-of-band communication may be an SMS message or even beeps produced by a speaker on the server itself.

Telecommunications
 Out-of-band signaling, the exchange of call control information in a separate band from the data or voice stream, or on an entirely separate, dedicated channel

Computing
 Out-of-band data, in computer networking, a separate stream of data from the main data stream
 Out-of-band management, in computer administration, system console access, even in the event of primary network subsystem failure
 Out-of-band authentication, user authentication over a network or channel separate from the primary network or channel; used in multi-factor authentication
 Out-of-band software documentation, documentation that is not provided together with the software it documents. This contrasts with Unix and Unix-like systems, for example, where software is documented through the means of on-line (meaning 'on a main computer', not 'over the internet') man pages provided as a component of the operating system. Out-of-band documentation, whether on web pages or in printed form, can suffer from a mismatch regarding the version and the exact set of features that are being documented.

See also
 In-band signaling
 Ident protocol

References

Out-of-band management